The Maui Fringe Festival is an annual alternative theatre festival held in Wailuku, on the island of Maui. This Hawaii festival is part of the Hawai'i Fringe Festival circuit, in conjunction with the annual O'ahu Fringe Festival. The event is organized and sponsored by Maui Onstage, a not-for-profit organization, and has run annually since 2011. The festival is staged in July at the historic Iao Theater, and is traditionally scheduled the weekend following the O'ahu Fringe Festival in late January.

Awards 
2012

 First Place: Joel William Agnew
 Second Place: Pride and Joy by Paul Rudnick
 Third Place: Payday At Pukalani by Margery Kreitman
 Hoku Award for Best Performance of the Festival: Tom Althouse 

2013

 First Place: They Call Me Q! by Qurrat Ann Kadwani
 Hoku Award for Best Performance of the Festival: ??

2014 

 First Place: Tale of Kathaka by Antara Bhardwaj
 Second Place: War Stories by Anthony Pignataro
 Third Place: Maple Street Militia by Teresa Salyer
 Hoku Award for Best Performance of the Festival: Tale of Kathaka by Antara Bhardwaj

2015 

 First Place: Hard Travelin’ With Woody by Randy Noojin 
 Second Place: ??
 Hoku Award for Best Performance of the Festival: Mandarin Orange by Kate Robards

2016

 First Place: Murder Blood Bear Story by Katelyn Schiller
 Second Place: Foolish Games by Improvocation
 Third Place Award: Money Talks: But What the Hell Is It Saying? by Lucie Lynch and Marcia Zina Mager
 Audience Choice Award: Money Talks: But What the Hell Is It Saying? by Lucie Lynch and Marcia Zina Mager
 Hoku Award for Best Performance of the Festival: Murder Blood Bear Story by Katelyn Schiller

2017

 First Place: Ain't That Rich by Kate Robards
 Second Place: Small Town Lawyer by Anthony Pignataro
 Third Place: Old Girls Looking Hot by Sharyn Stone
 Audience Choice Award: Ain't That Rich by Kate Robards
 Hoku Award for Best Performance of the Festival: Me, My Song, and I by Malcolm Grissom

2018 

 First Place: The Sex Life of Achilles by David LeBarron
 Second Place: Intrusion by Qurrat Ann Kadwani
 Third Place: Courted by Alison Logan
 Audience Choice Award: Vindication: Scenes from the Life of Mary Wollstonecraft by Lin McEwan
 Hoku Award for Best Performance of the Festival: Intrusion by Qurrat Ann Kadwani

Festival Lineups

2014 

 War Stories by Anthony Pignataro
 The Maple Street Militia by Teresa Salyer
 Tale of Kathaka by Antara Bhardwaj
 Adaptations Dance Theater

2015 

 Vivaldi’s Virgins by Early Maui Music
 Mandarin Orange by Kate Robards
 Hard Travelin’ With Woody by Randy Noojin
 Maui Improv
 BOOMERAGING: From LSD to OMG by Will Durst
 Adaptations Dance Theater
 Darshan Dance Project

2016 

 Murder Blood Bear Story
 Money Talks: But What the Hell Is It Saying? 
 Les Lapins Timides
 Foolish Games
 Maui Festival of Fringe: A Burlesque Revue
 Shadows of Hippocrates

2017 

 Small Town Lawyer by Anthony Pignataro
 Too Old To Be This Young by Laura Hedli
 Ain’t That Rich by Kate Robards
 Game of Thrones the Musical by Really Spicy Opera
 Old Girls Looking Hot by Sharyn Stone
 Me, My Song, and I by Malcolm Grissom
 Fado by Maui Aerial Arts
 Dream by Francis Tau'a

2018 

 The Sex Life of Achilles by David LeBarron
 Intrusion by Qurrat Ann Kadwani
 When Trump Gets To Heaven by Amorah St. John
 Courted by Alison Logan
 I Love Myself: The Masturbation Musical by Jaime Summers
 Vindication: Scenes from the Life of Mary Wollstonecraft by Lin McEwan
 Lawyers, Bombs and Death by Gabby Anderman and Chris Rose

References 

2011 establishments in Hawaii
Festivals in Hawaii